Holoptychius (from  , 'whole' and   'fold') is an extinct genus of porolepiform lobe-finned fish from the Middle Devonian to Carboniferous (Mississippian) periods. It is known from fossils worldwide. The genus was first described by Louis Agassiz in 1839.

Description 
Its rounded scales and body form indicate that it could have swum quickly through the water to catch prey. Similar to other rhipidistians, it had fang-like teeth on its palate in addition to smaller teeth on the jaws. Its asymmetrical tail sported a caudal fin on its lower end. To compensate for the downward push caused by this fin placement, the pectoral fins of Holoptychius were placed high on the body.

Species 
Of the genus Holoptychius the following species have been described:
 H. americanus 
 H. andersoni
 H. bergmanni (Downs et al, 2013) from the Frasnian-aged Fram Formation of Ellesmere Island, Arctic Canada
 H. flemingi
 H. giganteus
 H. halli
 H. hopkinsii
 H. nobilissimus
 H. quebecensis
 H. sp. indet. from the Kennebecasis Formation of New Brunswich, Canada.
 H. sp. indet. from the Cuche Formation of Colombia, known from an isolated tooth (UN-DG-PALV86) and preserved scales (UN-DG-PALV50-51).

Distribution 
Fossils of Holoptychius have been found in the Mississippian of the United Kingdom and the Devonian of Belgium, Colombia (Cuche Formation, Boyacá), Norway, Canada, the Russian Federation, and the United States (Pennsylvania).

Gallery

References

Bibliography 
 

Porolepiformes
Late Devonian fish
Carboniferous fish
Devonian fish of Europe
Devonian fish of North America
Prehistoric fish of South America
Devonian animals of South America
Devonian Colombia
Fossils of Colombia
Fossil taxa described in 1839
Taxa named by Louis Agassiz